Bror Meyer (1885–1956) was a Swedish figure skater. In 1906, he won the Swedish national title, placed fourth at the European Championships in Davos, and won the bronze medal at the World Championships in Munich. His manual, Skating with Bror Meyer, was published in 1921.

Competitive highlights

References 

1885 births
1956 deaths
Swedish male single skaters
World Figure Skating Championships medalists
Sportspeople from Stockholm